Barsine pretiosa is a moth of the family Erebidae. It was described by Frederic Moore in 1879. It is found in India.

References

Moths of Asia
Nudariina
Moths described in 1879